The locomotives of the Isle of Man Railway were provided exclusively by Beyer, Peacock & Company of Manchester, England between 1873 and 1926; other locomotives that appear on this list were inherited as part of the take-over of the Manx Northern Railway and Foxdale Railway in 1905, when the railway also purchased two more locomotives from Beyer, Peacock.

No.1 Sutherland

Isle of Man Railway No.1 Sutherland was built for the opening of the railway on 1 July 1873 this locomotive is named after the Duke of Sutherland who was a director of the railway company in its formative days.  it was given the honour of hauling the first official train to Peel and remained in service, albeit as Douglas shunter only latterly, until 1964 when it was withdrawn.  When the Marquess of Ailsa took over the railway in 1967 it was painted spring green and placed on static display at St John's, a tradition that later came to Douglas when the railway closed at the end of the 1968 season. When the railway museum was opened in 1975 it was given pride of place and it seemed that was the end of the line.  However, with anniversaries being in the air, it was brought back to Douglas in October 1997 for feasibility studies to examine it possible return to service for the Steam 125 celebrations the following year.  Using the privately owned boiler from No. 8 Fenella it was the star turn in 1998, and travelled to the Manx Electric Railway on occasion steaming from Laxey to Fairy Cottage.  it even made a brief return to Peel Station to commemorate the opening of the Peel line. it later was repainted to Indian red and withdrawn when the boiler was removed and replaced into the frames of No. 8.  No. 1 was stored undercover at Douglas station until late 2018 when work on cosmetically restoring it for display commenced. The completed locomotive was returned to the railway museum in 2020, where it took the place of No. 16 Mannin.

No. 2 Derby

Second of the original batch of locomotives delivered to the railway, No. 2 was named after the Earls of Derby who owned the Isle of Man before it was sold to the British monarch and is often seen in early photographs without it back cab sheet (No. 1 also appears in this form on a famous photograph of opening day.  No 2 Set the precedent for Steam On The Electric being used in construction by the Isle of Man Tramways & Electric Power Co. (there are two photographs illustrating this). No. 2 is the only locomotive on the railway to have been lost to the pages of history, only a pony truck survives today, and it is difficult to surmise if this was originally No. 2's as so many parts were interchanged on the locomotives. It was withdrawn in 1951 and dismantled at the time for use as spare parts for the other smaller class locomotives.  The Frames having survived in store for many years were scrapped in 1980 by "Pat the Rat" (a local scrapman) at the behest of the then manager Bill Jackson. The surviving pony truck was for many years at the end of Birkenhead Siding at Port Erin with No. 4 Try These chalked on it. Later relocated to Douglas yard, this pony truck was re-built with new roller bearing axleboxes and entered regular service under another locomotive in 2020. It survives as a final reminder of the only engine to not exist in one form or another.

No. 3 Pender

The third of the original trio was to have been named Viking originally, but the name was changed to honour the name of a director of the company Sir John Pender and it wouldn't be until over a century later in 1993 that an Isle Of Man Railway locomotive would carry the name.  The last purchase of 1873 from Beyer, Peacock, it was little modified over the years, when compared with it sisters, and was withdrawn from service in the 1950s.

In 1925 Pender was involved in an accident at Douglas station which resulted in the death of the fireman. The train failed to stop as it arrived at Douglas station, crashing through the buffers, and coming to rest embedded in the platform. The fireman was thrown from the footplate and suffered fatal injuries. Pender was re-boilered in 1888 and 1913. The third and current boiler was made in 1923 for No.2 "Derby", and was fitted in 1951 after that locomotive was broken up. The side rods are from No. 4. "Loch" (they are stamped 1416). Pender was canibalised for spare parts to keep the other locomotives in service. Many non-ferous fittings are missing.

Pender left the island in 1977 and now resides as a sectionalised exhibition display at the Science and Industry Museum in Manchester, a stone's throw from its birthplace. Pender was sectioned at the Museum: the boiler and firebox were life-expired and the right-hand cylinder is cracked. The right hand tank was removed and is in storage at the Museum; many cab fittings were missing before arrival at the Museum. Pender was re-painted after sectioning in an approximation of Isle of Man Livery but in BR Brunswick green.

No. 4 Loch

Named after lieutenant governor Henry Brougham Loch and beloved by many as their "favourite" engine on the railway, As originally built "Loch" was a small boilered locomotive, but it was rebuilt as a medium boilered locomotive in 1909.  This gave it the same tractive effort as Nos 10 and 11.  No. 4 has the strange distinction of being what must surely be the first locomotive ever to (re)enter service on the day the line closed. Having been earmarked for re-boilering in 1967 by the 1968 season it was ready for service and steam tests were carried out accordingly. Fate intervened however and at the end of September 1968 the Peel and Ramsey lines closed for good. Fortunately, the Port Erin line was retained and No. 4 was familiar to many as the south based engine for many years, right up until it withdrawal from service after the 1995 Christmas services on the railway. It was the only locomotive to carry a non functioning "bell-mouth" dome until the Salter safety valves were reinstated in 2021, and a non-standard livery of maroon was carried from 1979 to withdrawal. Of course, now it wears the familiar Indian red, and until the 2021 overhaul was distinguished from it shed-mates by carrying a Legs Of Mann and "4" numeral on it buffer beam. It was used heavily in the marketing campaign for the 1993 "Year Of Railways" when it was the locomotive chosen to haul special services on the Manx Electric Railway. Following withdraw in 1995 the Un-Loch Your Cash appeal by the Isle of Man Steam Railway Supporters' Association in 1998–2000 funded a replacement boiler. Reboilered for the fifth time in its history in 2002, the loco returned to being a regular fleet member once more. On 20 May 2008, it collided with a van and badly damaged its buffer beam, destroying the timber part. The boiler certificate expired on 31 August 2015 and following that day's services the locomotive with withdrawn from traffic. The overhaul began in 2017. This involved major rebuilding of all of the moving parts of the engine with replacement of some of the most worn, new side tanks, cab floor, coal bunker and replacement of all pipework. The boiler was overhauled by the Severn Valley Railway, replacing about half of it with new including the entire inner firebox. Completed with Salter safety valves, which have not been seen in service on the railway for over 60 years. In early 2021 No.4 had several test runs and was returned to service when the season commenced in late May.

No.5 Mona

Arriving with No. 4 in 1874 in readiness for the opening of the Port Erin line, the name "Mona" is named from the Latin name for the Isle of Man.  Rebuilt as a medium boilered locomotive in 1911. Last reboilered in 1946, No. 5 was a regular on the Peel line later in it career and remained in service right until the 1970 season when it refused to hold a head of steam and was subsequently mothballed. After storage, it was privately purchased from the newly nationalised railway in 1978 but remained on site, being stored in the carriage shed at Douglas until it was demolished to make way for new bus garage and offices in 1999. Until 2020 in the back of the new carriage shed (and having been relocated there in 1999 shortly after the original 1893 shed was demolished to make way for a new bus depot and administrative centre), No. 5 had had no attention for many years and was a sorry sight, still wearing it 1967 spring green livery, now very faded. It is not known if it will ever return to service but in the near future this seems unlikely. it was one of two (the other being No. 12) to carry a brass fleet numeral on the left-hand tank only. During 2020 the locomotive was dismantled to enable asbestos removal and in January 2022 an appeal was launched by the Isle of Man Steam Railway Supporters' Association to cosmetically restore the locomotive in time for the 150th anniversary celebrations of the Peel Line in 2023.

No. 6 Peveril

A one-off purchase in 1875 from Beyer, Peacock & Co. (works number 1524), and of similar design to Nos. 4 and 5, Peveril (named after a character in Sir Walter Scott's novel Peveril Of The Peak) saw extensive use on Peel Line for many years, apt as the name is also a local one.  it was rebuilt as a Medium Boiled locomotive in 1907, and last reboilered in 1932.  it was withdrawn from service, having been station shunter at Douglas for a number of years, in August 1960 and stored out of use thereafter.  In 1967 it was selected as one of the static display locomotives during the Marquess of Ailsa years at St.John's station and, after closure of the Peel and Ramsey lines in 1968 relocated to Douglas Station for display purposes.  Stored for several years together with No. 5 Mona in original 1893 Douglas carriage shed, it was removed from here and cosmetically restored by members of the Isle of Man Steam Railway Supporters' Association, a local preservation group, in 1994 and is now resident in the railway museum at Port Erin carrying the Indian red livery of the post-war years.  Sometimes considered as a restoration job by the railway, this has yet to be carried out but enthusiasts remain hopeful that this may happen one day. During 2020 the locomotive was temporarily removed from the Museum before returning in June 2021. During this period, it was partially dismantled to enable asbestos removal. No6 was returned to the museum during 2022 and given a new coat of paint, again in the Indian Red livery.

No. 7 Tynwald

Built in 1880 (Beyer, Peacock works number 2038) and named after the Manx Parliament, this locomotive has the dubious honour of being the first locomotive to have been withdrawn from service, as early as 1947 which accounts for the lack of photographs of her.  No. 7 was the first of the fleet to have sandboxes placed just ahead of the water tanks.  As a result, the shape of the feedwater pipe was changed from the original "C" shaped end to an "S" shape entering the boiler between the smokebox and first cladding ring, rather than between the first and second cladding rings.  The locomotive was involved in a collision with No. 10 G.H. Wood in 1928 and the frames were badly buckled at this time; owing to the large amount of work required to repair this, it was not selected for any further attention when withdrawn in 1947 and the locomotive dismantled.  Stripped down, the frames were stored on a siding at Douglas Station for many years, with the tanks and cab being stored separately and scrapped in 1974. Upon nationalisation, the remaining frames were purchased by what is now the Isle of Man Railway & Tramway Preservation Society and stored in the open air at Santon, later Castletown. Very little remains of them, other than the main frame, coal bunker, and buffer beams but they have however survived over the course of three decades and are an integral part of the railway's history.  In store off-site for a number of years, the frames were returned to public display on the goods platform at Castletown Station during November 2009. The frames have since been sent off Island and are now in storage in Weeting, Suffolk.

No. 8 Fenella

Originating from 1894 and named after a character in a novel by Sir Walter Scott, popular at the time, this locomotive was for many years based on the Ramsey Line of the railway and indeed remained in service until the Marquess of Ailsa revival in 1967.  It carries a unique, 2'11" diameter, 160psi boiler, which gives it the same theoretical power output as the medium boiler locomotives, but in reality it was inclined to run short of steam on heavy trains. It was purchased by a preservationist group in 1978 with a view to complete restoration and in 1988 the boiler was lifted from the frames and sent to the workshops of the Severn Valley Railway for re-construction.  This was a long-term project and as relationships between the owners and management soured, the project did not reach fruition.  Happily, the owners offered the boiler (now complete) to donor locomotive No. 1 Sutherland so that it could return to service for the Steam 125 celebrations in 1998 and after an agreed three years in No. 1 the boiler was lifted into No. 8 which operated as a member of the active fleet until early summer 2008. Being the sole representative of the smaller engines (No. 4 has been rebuilt to a medium configuration) it was often to be seen on lighter trains, specials and acting as station pilot.  it operated in May 2010 on non-passenger duties as part of the annual Rush Hour event and since this time a long dispute has been settled and the locomotive returned to railway ownership in April 2012 seeing service once again for the Rush Hour event. No. 8 made a return to the site of Peel Station for display to commemorate the 140th anniversary of the Peel line on 1 July 2013, placed on a short length of display track next to the former water tower at the station.  Following the close of the shortened 2020 season the boiler certificate expired and the locomotive was withdrawn.  In May 2022 the locomotive travelled off-island to attend the Beyer Bash at the Welshpool & Llanfair Light Railway.

No. 9 Douglas

A further increase in traffic led the railway company to order a further locomotive in 1896, with No.9 being the last locomotive from Gorton Foundry that year (Beyer, Peacock works number 3815). Reboilered only twice and most recently in 1912 "Douglas" is one of the most original fleet members, little altered since delivery.  The only major modifications being the fitting of vacuum brake equipment for train braking combined with a steam brake on the loco (the most obvious detail of this it the exhaust pipe from the cab front to the smokebox on the right hand side of the boiler). This also included conversion from wooden to iron brake blocks. Along with No 14 the loco was only ever fitted with Salter safety valves never receiving a more modern boiler.  Withdrawn in 1953 by which time it had been reduced to light duties, it was stored and cosmetically restored for the 1969 season but was ultimately sold in 1978 though fortunately has never left the railway.  it was partially repainted in the 1980s into a non-standard brown livery (one which is thought to have been carried by some locomotives based on early colour photos) with black/orange lining.  Later it was fully painted, again in a non-standard livery (the colour was previously used on the station building at Port Erin) with black/red lining which is the livery retained today.  it smokebox door went missing at some point and was replaced with a wooden version.  During 2020 No.9 was dismantled, asbestos removed and the boiler, tanks and cab all sand blasted and primed in red primer. The boiler is currently stored at Douglas, while the chassis and superstructure are currently stored in the running shed. In January 2023 the Isle of Man Steam Railway Supporters' Association unveiled plans to cosmetically restore the locomotive in order for it to take part in the 150th anniversary celebrations later that year, following a similar project with No.5 Mona.

No. 10 G. H.Wood

The first of two 1905 purchases, and the first "medium boiler" locomotive, No. 10 is named after the railway's one-time company secretary and director George Henry Wood and indeed when new, so proud was the director of his namesake that he posed for photographs in front of the locomotive, the photos then being reproduced on his Christmas cards.  As the first of the larger class of locomotives on the line, it was a regular performer and rarely out of service, operating mostly on the south line.  it worked through the Marquess of Ailsa years to nationalisation but was withdrawn in 1977 with defective boiler.  At this time it was stored in Douglas works and it wasn't until 1992 when sister No. 13 was withdrawn that it was reconditioned and launched at Easter 1993 as part of the Year of Railways sporting a darker green livery and black/red lining which was an approximation to it original livery. The locomotive wears the Spring Green livery applied in 2007 to mark the fortieth anniversary of the takeover of the railway by Lord Ailsa.  Together with No. 12 they are the only service locos to not carry chimney numerals. It featured in the movie Five Children & It. The boiler certificate expired on 1 August 2017, its last appearance was the 50th anniversary celebrations of the re-opening of Douglas station on 29 July 2017. The overhaul began shortly afterwards with the boiler being sent away for overhaul in April 2018 and the frames to Alan Keef Ltd in October 2020.

No. 11 Maitland

Stalwart of the fleet and rarely out of service, the second of the 1905-built locomotives was named after another company director and is fondly remembered by several generations of enthusiasts as the longest-serving fleet member. Having been re-boilered in 1959 this ensured it future well into the final years of company operation, through the Marquess of Ailsa years and into nationalisation.  Another boiler was fitted in 1981 (the first under government ownership) when it was re-painted into the current Indian red having previously sported a variation of the spring green livery. The boiler tubes for this new boiler were funded by the Isle of Man Steam Railway Supporters' Association, a local preservation group.  In 1989 it was chosen to take part in The Ginger Tree, a television dramatisation being filmed on the railway and was painted into an unlined matt black livery which it retained for the rest of that season before being returned to a variation on the Indian red livery. it also featured in the movie Five Children & It. The locomotive sports a brass safety valve bonnet mounted on the boiler (the others being painted) but this was originally carried by No. 13 Kissack until 1971.  The locomotive had last worked in 2007 and a new boiler from the Severn Valley Railway (New boiler 1). The frames were moved off site for restoration by Alan Keef in 2017. The loco was moved to the Statfold Barn Railway for reassembly and painting in 2020 and returned to the railway on 6 January 2022 for trials before re-entering service in time for the railway's season.

No. 12 Hutchinson

The twelfth locomotive was a one-off order, similar in design to it two sisters purchased in 1905.  Built in 1908 (Beyer Peacock works number 5126), and named after company director W. A. Hutchinson, it was delivered to the railway with Salter safety valves and a deeper tone of whistle than had previously been employed.  Still in service today, it has always been one of the most active members of the fleet, perhaps only surpassed by No. 11 Maitland and appearance-wise has had a chequered career.  Today, it is largely in 1950s condition, carrying the Indian red livery of the period but it previous guise was much more contrasting.  When the newly nationalised railway was in need of infrastructure refurbishment, No. 12 was the second loco to be fitted with a new Hunslet boiler.  At this time it was given larger water tanks and a square "house" or cab supposedly similar to that carried by No. 16 Mannin.  These features, together with a non-prototypical blue livery gave the loco a somewhat odd appearance when compared with it shed-mates, and the look was not widely liked.  Due to the higher side tanks, it was inclined to roll more at speed than the other locomotives in it rebuilt form.  it did however remain in this guise until withdrawn from service for rebuild and re-entered traffic in 2001 in traditional form.  Also of note is that it was one of only two engines (the other being No. 5) to carry a brass fleet number above the name plate on tank.  This was lost prior to the 1981 rebuild and was reinstated for the 2009 season. Returned to service in April 2017 following a winter overhaul and withdrawn following expiration of boiler certificate on 31 August 2019.  Work on an overhaul commenced in May 2021.

No. 13 Kissack

Another one-off order from 1910 (Beyer, Peacock works number 5382), and named after a company director; unlucky 13 (latterly referred to as 12a by some of the railway's staff) was one of the backbones of the railway's fleet, having seldom been out of service until withdrawn with defective boiler at Christmas 1992; the boiler was refurbished and placed in the frames of No. 10 G.H.Wood which re-entered service as part of the Year of Railways in 1993 but No. 13 was left in dismantled form and stored.  In 2001 it was announced that it would be the recipient of a new boiler and by the season of 2006 it was returned to steam.  Painted in the now "fleet" livery of Indian red, it previous incarnation had been a deep Brunswick green, not thought to have been an historic livery of the railway but more a "nice colour" at the time.  it carries the deeper whistle that it will be remembered for in the 1980s but the brass safety valve bonnet that originates from this locomotive was, for a time, carried by No. 11, being reunited with No.13 for a Winter Photography event in February 2013 and remained since this time.  No. 13 is a regular performer on the railway and part of the active fleet since returning to service in 2006 with a new boiler.  When performing steam trials prior to this, the locomotive appeared with "12a" chalked on the back cab sheet, evidently by a superstitious member of workshop staff.  No. 13 was withdrawn from service in 2013 for boiler repairs. These were completed in March 2015 and the locomotive is now back in service, spending April of that year turned chimney-first into Douglas for the first time in many years for a short spell.  The locomotive emerged in the holly green livery in March 2016.

No. 14  Thornhill

Built for the Manx Northern Railway in 1880, this locomotive was originally numbered 3, becoming 14 upon the merger with the Isle of Man Railway in 1905 but not receiving its number and chimney numeral immediately (the numerals were lost in 1956 when a replacement chimney was fitted).  it was the only locomotive purchased by the Manx Northern to be built by Beyer Peacock & Co., in their Gorton Foundry in Manchester (works number 2028), and was similar in design to No. 7 Tynwald.  Unique among the fleet in still being in almost "original" form, it retained it distinctive Salter safety valves until withdrawal from service in 1963 and after storage it was repainted into an approximation of it original colour scheme and placed on display at St John's station during the 1967 and 1968 seasons, and later at Douglas station.  In 1978 it was sold for private preservation on the island and remained there for some time, unavailable for public viewing. In July 2021 it was photographed in the workshops of John Fowler Ltd. in Ulverston.

No. 15 Caledonia

This unique one-off 0-6-0T locomotive dates from 1885 and is the only engine on the line to have been built by Dübs & Co, of Glasgow; purchased to tackle the steep gradients of the Foxdale Railway it was ideally suited to the job, being heavier and more powerful than any other steam locomotive on the island. After the merger in 1905 it was numbered 15 in the Isle of Man Railway fleet (having previously been Manx Northern's No. 4) and only saw sporadic use, most notably on Ramsey Cattle Mart specials and for snow clearing trains and emergencies.  It was reboilered in 1923, receiving the first boiler on the IMR to carry "Ross" pop safety valves.  When the Marquess of Ailsa took over operations in 1967 it was repainted into a spring green livery and saw service once again acting as Douglas station pilot and operated on the south line until 1968. It proved to be a magnet to railway enthusiasts when restored to service by Lord Ailsa. By 1975 it had been painted into Manx Northern colours and placed in the then new museum at Port Erin where it remained until 1993 when it was returned to Douglas by road for steam feasibility tests.  By 1995 it was the star of the show, operating on the 1 in 12 gradients of the Snaefell Mountain Railway as part of the centenary celebrations.  This had historical precedent as Caledonia had been leased for construction purposes in 1895.  It has since been part of the stable of serviceable locomotives, having been painted into a non-prototypical dark blue livery in 1999 but reverted to the intricate original paint scheme in 2007.  The locomotive was the subject of a major rebuild from 2009 and returned to service in January 2013.  It was prematurely withdrawn from service in 2014 with boiler problems. The overhauled boiler was returned from the Severn Valley Railway in April 2018 and the locomotive was returned to steam in September 2018.

No. 16 Mannin

The last locomotive to be supplied to the railway and built in 1926, again by Beyer, Peacock & Co. (works number 6296), No. 16 was by far the most powerful 2-4-0T locomotive on the line.  it was purchased to haul the heavy Port Erin boat train, a job which had previously taken two locomotives either double-headed or banked.  Larger than its older sisters, differences include a larger diameter boiler (3'6"), larger side tanks (520 gallon), higher boiler pressure (180psi) and larger cylinders (12" bore). It was also the only locomotive to be fitted with a vacuum ejector and steam sanders from new. It was a rarely used away from the Port Erin line during its active career and when not required, as outside the holiday season there would be a much reduced service (and no boat train), would be stored in the locomotive shed there. It spent its last few years used as a Douglas-based engine on the Peel line, when due to poor boiler condition the maximum pressure was reduced which would have dramatically reduced performance.  It appears it never travelled north of Kirk Michael on the Ramsey line—certainly there is no photographic evidence to support this.  It remained in service until 1964 and later was repainted into spring green and placed on static display at St John's and later Douglas stations until entering the railway museum in 1975 with Caledonia and Sutherland.  Briefly considered as a candidate for restoration in 1967, but rejected on account of it non-standard design, it has only ventured out of the museum once, for rebuilding in 1998/1999, and at that time it was treated to "lining out" of paintwork, the previous coat having never been lined.  There were two locomotives bearing this name, the other being a mock-up used in the annual Douglas Carnival parade; the fate of that loco is unknown. In early 2019 it was announced that Mannin would be removed from the museum for restoration to working order, its place being taken by No. 1 Sutherland once its cosmetic work is completed. The railway hopes to have Mannin back in full working order in time for the 150th anniversary of the opening of the Isle of Man Railway in 2023.  The locomotive was removed from the museum in early 2020, and the boiler has been sent to the Severn Valley Railway for assessment.

No. 17 Viking

This engine was built by Schöma of Germany in 1958 and purchased by the railway in 1992 replacing the time-expired railcars (see below) which after many years of neglect were reaching the end of their useful lives (without receiving serious attention).  As part of the Year of Railways celebrations in 1993 and following competition in the local press, the locomotive was named Viking, the name originally to have been allocated to No. 3 Pender back in 1873, and it was outshopped in a dark green livery similar to that carried by No. 10 G.H.Wood at the time.  Upon delivery it had been in unlined green livery with the fleet number 208 on it cab sheet, a memory of it first owner "Braunschweigische Kohlenbergwerke (BKB)", Helmstedt, Germany, where it had run on  gauge in an opencast coalmine. Beset in latter years by problems through lack of maintenance, No. 17 is now in the spring green livery following comments made by local preservationists that a loco (preferably steam) should appear in this colour scheme.  Whilst usually restricted to non-passenger services, No. 17 saw some use in traffic during the 2010 season owing to steam locomotive failure; it is usually in operation as part of the annual railway-based events Rush Hour in April/May each year and the Manx Heritage Transport Festival each July.  The locomotive is currently stored and unserviceable, its future remains uncertain. The Department of Community Culture and Leisure announced in 2012 that were will be seeking £750,000 of Government funding for a new build locomotive to replace Viking. In October 2012 was announced that a replacement diesel engine had been sourced to replace Viking with delivery expected in Spring 2013.

No. 18 Ailsa

No. 18 was built for the Jubilee line extension of the London Underground in 1994 and used by the contractors who re-laid approximately 2/3 of the Port Erin line in conjunction with the IRIS project (a sewerage scheme which saw a main pipeline being laid beneath the railway in 2000-2002 resulting in shuttle services being operated). The locomotive was bought from the contractors upon completion of the work and named "Ailsa" in honour of Archibald Kennedy, 7th Marquess of Ailsa, who had greatly contributed to the railway in the late 1960s. It was stated at the time that the loco would receive a spring green livery (known as "Ailsa Green" as it was standard livery at the time of his ownership) but it remained in plain white livery, until removal of some of its ballast weights which has resulted in a red oxide lower half with a white upper. The locomotive was originally built to work on the construction railway in the Channel Tunnel which accounts for the somewhat squat appearance, although the cab was extended upwards before its arrival on island. This also results in limited visibility for the driver which has seen it fitted with closed circuit television cameras to aid vision. However, this disability as well as the absence of a continuous train braking system (in this case vacuum brakes) and also a mechanically governed top speed of  ensures that the locomotive is used largely on shunting and permanent way duties being unsuitable for passenger workings.

Nos. 19 & 20 Diesel Railcars

When the County Donegal Railways Joint Committee was selling surplus assets in the early 1960s, the Isle of Man Railway were looking for a cheap alternative to their ageing steam locomotive fleet and purchased these two railcars.  They had already been allocated fleet numbers which were retained by the new owners but it was only when the ex-contractors' engine No. 18 Ailsa was officially numbered in 2005 that the fleet had ever been in correct sequence.  These railcars have been the subject of much controversy in the late 1990s when their over-budget rebuild was brought to a halt by incoming management and since this time no work has been done on them.  The preservationist group Isle of Man Steam Railway Supporters' Association have campaigned for their completion, especially in conjunction with a potential commuter train services between Port Erin, Castletown and Douglas, which would extend the service that is laid on annually by the railway in connection with the T.T..  The TT Commuter service is currently run using a steam locomotive and hauled stock, which leads to high operating costs.  A shift in management attitude could see their return to service in the future, but for the time being, they remain in store at Douglas station awaiting completion and return to service.

No. 21 

Built as a replacement for No. 17 Viking it is the first new locomotive to join the fleet since No. 18 Ailsa. The locomotive's underframe, bodywork, engine, generator and controls are brand new. The bogies are modified from a GE industrial locomotive. It is the first locomotive on the Isle of Man Railway to feature a cab at each end, arriving on the Isle of Man in December 2013. Early tests revealed a problem with overheating, and a new prime mover was supplied by the manufacturers under warranty. Further testing saw the locomotive perform several passenger duties, notably at the head of the railway's dining train. It has however, seen very limited service since. It finally entered regular service in August 2019. This, however, only lasted a couple of weeks before a "Power problem" caused it to become stranded in sidings at Castletown. This was its most recent spell in revenue service.
Technical issues are understood to included slipped tyres on the wheels, software problems, oil leaks, transmission seizures and traction motor flashovers.

Nos. 22 & 23 Wickham Trolleys

There are also two Wickham-built four-wheel railcars used by the permanent way gangs, and these are often transferred between the Manx Electric Railway and the line as required. One of these (nominally carrying No.23) was rebuilt in 2013, the other was restored to original condition in 2014. A third railcar was formerly used on the Queen's Pier Tramway in Ramsey and was brought to the railway in 1975 for use when the Peel and Ramsey lines were lifted, it has since been scrapped.  No.22 carries its fleet number above both end windows and No.23 has vinyl decals in one window.

Nos. 24 & 25 The Simplexes

There are two Simplex locomotives on the railway, one of which is based at Port Erin for shunting purposes; the other can be found occasionally on the electric railway and has a driver's cab and Railway Company crests applied to its cab sides; No.24 was repainted in September 2018 and received a fleet number and painted-on name for the first time, while No.25 carries no fleet details at present.

The "Sharpies"

The Manx Northern Railway's first two engines were provided by Sharp, Stewart and Company for the line's opening in 1879 and were 2-4-0 side tank locomotives bearing the names Ramsey and Northern.  J.I.C. Boyd in his "Isle of Man Railway (Oakwood Press 1967) points out that the Sharpies were dimensionally similar to the Beyer Peacock locomotives built for the IMR.  However, in their use of a leading radial axle, rather than a Bissell truck, and other features, they were more conventional examples of mid-Victorian locomotive design than the Isle of Man Railway's Beyers.  Boyd mentions that they were tested at speed before their entry into service and officially restricted to 45 mph.  There have been some suggestions that their shorter wheelbase, 11'6" as opposed to 13'9" for the Beyer Peacock locomotives, made their ride less than steady at higher speeds.  However, this does not seem to have limited their usefulness as both were reboilered in 1892/3, and McNabb ("Isle of Man Railway," 1945) reports that they were both "worn out" by 1905. Ramsey was hired to IOMTEPCo by the MNR for construction work in the 19th century. Whilst there are very few photographs in existence, it is known that they survived the takeover by the Isle of Man Railway in 1905 but were never re-numbered as the other two Manx Northern locomotives were.  They saw very little use on the line after takeover (the railway having only just purchased Nos. 10 and 11 at this time) and were scrapped in 1923 and 1912 respectively.  Ramsey is reported to have been used to haul Permanent Way trains (Boyd, op. cit.) in the years before 1914.  Their fate other than these dates is not known and they have become part of the folklore of the island's railway network, lost in the mists of time.  It seems likely, however, that as non-standard locomotives, they were scrapped as soon as the traffic department regarded them as surplus to future requirements.  This probably occurred after the delivery of No. 13 Kissack in 1910.  There is some evidence (Boyd, op. cit.) that the Railway attempted to sell "Ramsey" in 1919, and again in 1920 as a contractors' locomotive.

Boiler variants 
All of the Isle of Man Railways locomotives and Manx Northern No. 3 Thornhill were built to an adaptation of a very successful 1866 design Beyer Peacock had supplied for the  gauge lines of Norwegian State Railways (NSB).  Apart from being constructed for  gauge, the major dimensions are identical to the Norwegian Class IV "Trygve".  The Manx locomotives came in three principle variants; the ten "Small Boiler" locomotives consisting of Nos. 1 to 9, and Manx Northern No. 3 (later Isle of Man Railway No.14) as built.  These had 2'10.75" boilers pressed at 120 psi.  The cylinders were 11" diameter by 18" stroke, and the driving wheels 45".  They were delivered in three, slightly differing, batches.  Locomotives 1 to 3 had 320 gallon water tanks, round cab spectacle plates, and "C" shape feed pipes; 4 to 6 were built with 385 gallon tanks, square cab spectacle plates, and "C" shape feed pipes; and 7 and 14 with 385 gallon tanks, square spectacle plates, and "S" shape feed pipes.  8 and 9 were supplied with 160 psi boilers, but were otherwise largely identical to 7 and 14.

The four locomotives that constitute the "medium" series are Nos. 10 to 13; the boilers were enlarged from 2'10.75" diameter to 3'3" and pressed to 160 psi.  Whilst this did not increase the theoretical tractive effort, it was found that they were considerably less prone to running short of steam on the long climbs out of Douglas on the way to Port Erin and on the Ramsey line out of St. John's.  These locomotives were built with 480 gallon water tanks.  Cylinder and driving wheel dimensions were unchanged.  Three small boiler locomotives - 4, 5, and 6 - were rebuilt to the Medium boiler variant, complete with 480 gallon water tanks,  in 1907-14.  No. 16, with its 3'6" diameter boiler pressed at 180 psi, and 12" by 18" cylinders is the solitary example of the "Large Boiler" variant.  it also carries 520 gallon water tanks.

Liveries
For the official works photograph, engines were painted in works grey upon completion. The original company livery is thought to have been a deep green colour with black lining and either white or vermilion outer lining.  This remained the standard livery of the line, with slight variations, down to the end of World War II.  The original white lining gave way to orange/red at some point, probably around 1905, and there was a gradual reduction in the mount of detail applied to the lining over the years.  A 1949 colour photograph of Mannin shows it in unlined green - perhaps as a result of a repaint early in World War II, whilst Fenella is seen in a work worn late 1930s version of the livery applied when it was reboilered in 1936/7.

It wasn't until 1944 that the railway changed the standard livery to Indian red which is a rusty, orange colour, akin to red iron oxide or red lead.  The "Indian Red" paint as produced in the railway's workshop and tended to oxidise over time.  Recently repainted locomotives would be a deep red colour with a hint of orange; those that had not visited the paint shop in some time would be a reddish brown. This was lined out white-black-white, and remained standard until the 1967 re-opening when Lord Ailsa had service locomotives repainted into a fresh "spring" green livery.  This was very similar to London and North Eastern Railway apple green. The story goes that the Rev. Teddy Boston, a friend of the Marquess had a 4 mm scale model of an Isle of Man locomotive that he had painted in LNER colours.  This was shown to Ailsa in the spring of 1967, who liked it, and had 5, 8, 10, 11, 12 and 15 quickly repainted to match!  Spring green became standard livery until nationalization, when the new Isle of Man Railways management decided to repaint the locomotives in a variety of colours to dispel the notion that there were only two engines on the line.  The first so treated was No.4 Loch which appeared in a non-standard Midland Red livery for the 1979 season.  Two years later No. 11 Maitland appeared in a variation on the Indian red scheme, though it briefly ran in a dull black livery after being used for the BBC production of 'The Ginger Tree' in the late 1980s.  There then followed by the most bizarre incarnation of them all, a royal blue No. 12 Hutchinson complete with alleged "Mannin-Style" square cab.  This was never popular with the enthusiasts and when the locomotive was reboilered in 2001 it reverted to traditional Beyer, Peacock "house" with its wrapped over front and rear plates.  No. 13 Kissack appeared in Brunswick green c.1980, and remained in that livery until withdrawn in 1992.  When G H Wood re-entered service in 1993 it took over from Kissack as the dark green locomotive, whilst Sunderland was out-shopped in spring green for the 1998 season.

This variety of liveries continued in use until 1999 when, upon the arrival of new management, all locos were swiftly painted into Indian red, harking back to the immediate post war years.  The exception there was Caledonia which was painted dark blue, and got to play Thomas the Tank Engine for the annual 'Thomas and Friends' event.  Locomotive No.10 G.H. Wood was out-shopped in spring green in 2007 marking the 40th anniversary of the takeover by Lord Ailsa, and Caledonia reverting to it original Manx Northern livery shortly afterwards. Presently 4, 8, 12 and 13 carry the post war Indian Red livery, No.10 carries the Ailsa era Green, and Caledonia is running in the earlier, more elaborate version of the MNR's Claret livery.

The railcars from the County Donegal Railway were in a red and cream colour scheme when they arrived on the island in 1961, and when repainted by the railway company into a version of the then standard dark red and cream IMR carriage livery.  This differed from the carriage livery in that cream was retained only for the waist stripe, whilst the window surrounds were painted deep red.  They remained in this livery until 1981/1982 when they visited the paintshops, one being outshopped in a cheerful blue and white livery for a very short time.  Unfortunately, the Falklands War broke out shortly thereafter, and having them in Argentine colours was not deemed appropriate so they were hastily repainted to a red and white scheme (the same as that carried by the island's buses at the time) and they remained like this until withdrawal from service in the early 1990s.

No.17 Viking was a deep green colour upon arrival in 1992 and was repainted (but with black/orange lining added) for the naming ceremony in 1993.  In 1999, when a local support group voiced the opinion that one engine on the line should be in the spring green livery, the management chose No. 17 to be so treated; it remains in this colour scheme, albeit slightly more grubby, today.  No. 18 Ailsa was all over white upon delivery and there has been mention that it would be painted into another colour, spring green being mooted owing to the loco's name, but this has yet to happen.  The two Simplex locomotives are painted blue, and yellow, whilst the Wickham railcars are also blue with yellow chevrons.

Idiosyncrasies
Whilst all from the same manufacturer broadly to the same design, the Beyer, Peacocks all have slight differences; for example, the first trio have their nameplates mounted forward of the injector feed pipe, whereas Nos. 4 and 5 are central, meaning the name plates unusually read "LO CH" and "MO NA", there being a gap where the pipe passes through!   All Isle of Man Railway locomotives were supplied with brass chimney numerals, whilst the ex-MNR engines received them following the 1905 merger.  Today No. 10 does not carry any chimney numerals, and No. 15 lost hers when it identity was returned to Manx Northern Railway No. 4 in 2007; when originally returned to traffic in 1995 it carried both numbers at once!  In 1946 Beyer Peacock supplied three boilers with new cast iron chimneys which were not fitted with numerals.  These boilers were fitted to Nos. 5, 10, and 12, which lost their chimney numerals as a result.  It was at this point that No. 5 and No. 12 gained small tank side number plates. 12 lost hers again when reboilered in 1981.  Over the years, the water tanks of each loco were patched when they leaked, resulting in each one being distinctive by their pattern of patches; this is not noticeable today as the tanks are welded and the rivets are only dummies for aesthetic purposes.  No. 6 Peveril in the museum does however retain it patched tanks.  There are several other differences for the die-hard enthusiast, such as the grab rail on the back of No.5's cab is of a different style to all the others, No. 11 has a brass safety valve bonnet (at one time carried by No. 13 have been recycled from a pre-1939 boiler fitted to No.13 prior to it 1971 reboilering), No. 4 features fleet number and three legs of man in brass on the buffer beam, etc.

Whistles
The stable of Beyer, Peacock locomotives carry standard whistles, these can be broken down simply as high, medium and low.  The medium tone of whistle is more commonplace for the simple reason that whenever a new boiler was supplied it came with a whistle.  The higher "pea" whistle on the pre-1905 locomotives also has two variants, with 1-6 being higher than 7-9 and it was the distinctive shrill original whistle that No. 4 Loch carried in from 1978 to 1995 that will be remembered more recently.  The third, much deeper tone of whistle was carried by Nos. 12 and 13 upon delivery but this changed so that by the 1950s they carried the standard one.  When No. 13 was rebuilt in 1971 a new deeper whistle was provided by Hunslet, and events came full circle when No. 12 was extensively overhauled in 2001 it took was fitted with the original deeper whistle, later being replaced by the medium toned one.  Until withdrawal, No.4, known for the distinctive high pitch whistle, had been replaced with a medium tone one, leaving only  No. 8 Fenella and Caledonia with a shrill whistle.  It is not known what type of whistles were carried by the scrapped Sharp, Stewart locomotives.  On occasion, such as at Thomas Days, Santa Specials and the end of season trains, staff members put their own whistles on locomotives, such as triple-chimes but these were never fitted to the locomotives originally.

See also
 Isle of Man Railway stations
 Isle of Man Railway rolling stock
 Isle of Man Railway Museum
 Isle of Man Steam Railway Supporters' Association

References

 James I.C. Boyd Isle Of Man Railway, Volume 3, The Routes & Rolling Stock (1996) 
 Norman Jones Scenes from the Past: Isle of Man Railway (1994) 
 Robert Hendry Rails in the Isle of Man: A Colour Celebration (1993) 
 A.M Goodwyn Manx Transport Kaleidoscope, 2nd Edition (1995)
 David Lloyd-Jones Manx Peacocks: A Profile of Steam on the Isle of Man Railway (1998) 

 Locomotives
Beyer, Peacock locomotives
Sharp Stewart locomotives
Dübs locomotives
Narrow gauge locomotives
2-4-0T locomotives